The Jack Brooks Federal Building is a federal office building in Beaumont, Texas. Completed during the Great Depression in 1933, it was the United States Post Office and Federal Building. The building houses courtrooms and chambers of the United States District Court for the Eastern District of Texas, and an office of the United States Postal Service. In 1978, President Jimmy Carter came to Beaumont to officiate over the renaming of the building for Congressman Jack Brooks, who lived in and represented the area for many years.

The building features many Corinthian columns and has many detailed features. The building is listed on the National Register of Historic Places as a contributing property to the Beaumont Commercial District.

See also

National Register of Historic Places listings in Jefferson County, Texas

References

External links

Federal Judicial Center Historic Federal Courthouses page on the Jack Brooks Federal Building
Eastern District of Texas page on the Beaumont Division, served by the Jack Brooks Federal Building

Federal buildings in the United States
Buildings and structures in Beaumont, Texas
Federal courthouses in the United States
Government buildings completed in 1933
Government buildings on the National Register of Historic Places in Texas
Courthouses in Texas
Post office buildings in Texas
Art Deco architecture in Texas
Historic district contributing properties in Texas
National Register of Historic Places in Jefferson County, Texas